Dylan Martin Alcott,  (born 4 December 1990) is an Australian former wheelchair tennis player, former wheelchair basketball player, radio host and motivational speaker. Alcott was a member of the Australia men's national wheelchair basketball team, known colloquially as the Australian "Rollers". At the age of 17, he became the youngest Rollers gold medal winner, at the 2008 Beijing Paralympics, and was the youngest to compete in the wheelchair basketball competition. In 2014, he returned to wheelchair tennis with the aim of participating at the 2016 Rio Paralympics, at which he won gold medals in the Men's Quad Singles and Doubles. He was named the 2016 Australian Paralympian of the Year due to his outstanding achievements at Rio.

Alcott is the only man to complete the Golden Slam in quad singles, winning all four majors and the Paralympics in 2021. In addition, he also won a separate non-calendar-year Grand Slam in quad singles between 2018 and 2019. He is also the only man to complete the Grand Slam in quad doubles, winning all four major titles in 2019.

Alongside his sporting career, Alcott hosted the weekend afternoon radio show on Australian radio station Triple J, and the ABC live music show The Set, as well as being a commentator for the 2019 Australian Open. He also was a member of the panel on the AFL Footy Show in 2019 until its cancellation.

In 2022, Alcott was named Australian of the Year and was made an Officer of the Order of Australia. A portrait by Felix von Dallwitz titled Dylan Alcott, AOTY was a finalist in the 2022 Archibald Prize.

Early life
Dylan Alcott was born in Melbourne, Victoria, on 4 December 1990 to parents Martin and Resie. He has an older brother named Zack. He was born with a tumour wrapped around his spinal cord which was operated on during the first few weeks of his life. The tumour was successfully cut out; however, it left Alcott a paraplegic, requiring him to use a wheelchair.

Alcott attended Brighton Grammar School from year 6, and he competed for Victoria in swimming, and Australia for wheelchair tennis and wheelchair basketball. Alcott graduated Brighton Grammar school in 2008.

Alcott's first sport of choice was wheelchair tennis, where he represented Australia on numerous occasions, reaching a ranking of 100 in the world by age 16 (4th in the world for under-18s).

Basketball

Alcott played his first game of wheelchair basketball aged 14. Alcott made his debut for the Australia men's national wheelchair basketball team, the Rollers, at the 2006 Wheelchair Basketball World Championship, where the team won the bronze medal. Alcott continued to hold his spot and was a member of the Rollers when the team travelled to the Beijing Olympic warm-up tournament in January 2008. Alcott made his name in basketball through his performances in the national league competition, competing for the Dandenong Rangers (no affiliation with the female team of the same name) and being selected in the all-star team for 2008. He has achieved success through junior competition as well, being named the Most Valuable Player at the Junior National Basketball Championships.

Alcott was part of the gold medal-winning Rollers team at the 2008 Summer Paralympics, for which he received a Medal of the Order of Australia. In his first Paralympics, Alcott was quoted: "To be 17 and win gold... well it just doesn't get any better than that."

In 2009, Alcott accepted a scholarship at the University of Illinois at Urbana–Champaign, where he went on to win the College Championship division with the University of Illinois wheelchair basketball team. After one year of study, he decided to move back to Melbourne to train for the 2012 London Paralympic Games.

In 2010, Alcott was a part of the Rollers' success at the 2010 Wheelchair Basketball World Championship in Birmingham, England. It was the first world championship the Australian wheelchair basketball team had ever won, and Alcott was named in the World All Star 5 for the tournament.

At the 2012 Summer Paralympics, Alcott was part of the Australian men's wheelchair team that won silver.

Tennis

In 2014, Alcott returned to wheelchair tennis. At the age of 16, he was ranked inside the top five juniors in the world. In July 2014, he defeated world number three Andy Lapthorne 7–5, 6–1 in the British Open Wheelchair Tennis Championship final in Nottingham to win his first Super Series crown. Early in the year, he won the New Zealand Open in just his second tournament appearance. In January 2015, he won the quad wheelchair Australian Open title by defeating David Wagner in straight sets. It was his maiden grand slam title. At the conclusion on 2015, he was ranked number 1 after winning eight titles including two grand slam singles titles.

Alcott teamed up with Heath Davidson to win the Men's Quad Doubles gold medal at the 2016 Rio Paralympics. They defeated the reigning champions David Wagner and Nick Taylor in the gold medal match 4–6, 6–4, 7–5. The day after winning gold in the Men's Doubles, he defeated Andy Lapthorne 6–3, 6–4 to win the gold medal in the Men's Quad Singles.

In 2018, Alcott won his first Wheelchair Tennis Masters title in the Quads singles event.

Golden Slam: 2021
In 2021, Alcott became the third professional tennis player and only male player to win the calendar-year Golden Slam, winning singles titles in the Australian Open, French Open, Wimbledon, US Open and the singles gold medal at the 2020 Summer Paralympics. He joined fellow professional wheelchair tennis player Diede de Groot in achieving the feat in 2021. They were the first two professional tennis players since Steffi Graf in 1988 to accomplish the feat.

After winning the Paralympics gold medal, Alcott announced he would not be featuring in the 2024 Paris Paralympics, retiring from the competition. In November 2021, Alcott announced his intention to retire from professional tennis entirely following the January 2022 Australian Open.

Television presenting
Alcott has hosted Invictus Games Today, alongside Chris Bath and Anthony "Lehmo" Lehmann, and ABC's live music show The Set. He is a TV Week Logie award winner.

Personal life
Alcott's return to wheelchair tennis after playing basketball resulted from an injury sustained in the lead-up to the 2012 Summer Paralympics. At an event, an inebriated person attempted to lift Alcott out of his wheelchair, leading to a fall in which Alcott sustained cuts from broken glass on the floor. He required a full hand reconstruction; once rehabilitated, he became eligible for a quad classification in tennis.

Alcott has a Commerce degree from the University of Melbourne. He currently works as a motivational speaker and as a radio host on Triple J. In his spare time, Alcott attends music festivals, and he has become known for his "wheelchair crowdsurfing". In 2018, he launched Ability Fest, a universally accessible music festival, featuring pathways for wheelchairs, quiet areas for people with sensory disabilities, and Auslan (Australian Sign Language) interpreters.

Alcott's advice to young people with a disability is: "The biggest thing is that for every one thing you can’t do, there are 10,000 others you can. For every one idiot to give you a hard time, there are 10,000 others worth your time."

In 2017, Alcott established the Dylan Alcott Foundation "with the core purpose of helping young Australians with disabilities gain self-esteem and respect through sport and study". In September 2017, Alcott was appointed Australian Patron for International Day of People with Disability.

Alcott's autobiography, Able: Gold Medals, Grand Slams and Smashing Glass Ceilings, written with help by Grantlee Kieza, was published by ABC Books in 2018. Alcott has also released the book in audiobook form, reading the book himself.

Alcott's partner is sex therapist Chantelle Otten.

Tennis career statistics

Performance timelines

Current through 2021 US Open.

Quad singles

Quad doubles

Grand Slam finals

Quad singles: 18 (15 titles, 3 runner-ups)

Quad doubles: 19 (8 titles, 11 runner-ups)

Paralympic gold medal matches

Quad singles: 2 (2 Gold medals)

Quad doubles: 2 (1 Gold medal, 1 Silver medal)

Recognition
 2009 – Medal of the Order of Australia
 2015 – Tennis Australia Newcombe Medal nominee
 2015 – Tennis Australia Most Outstanding Athlete with a Disability
 2015 – Victorian Institute of Sport Award of Excellence
 2016 – Governor's Award for Victorian Sportsperson of the Year
 2016 – Finalist for 'The Don Award' Sport Australia Hall of Fame awards
 2016 – Australian Paralympian of the Year and Australian Male Paralympian of the Year
 2016 – Tennis Australia Awards – Newcombe Medal and shared the Most Outstanding Athlete with a Disability with doubles partner Heath Davidson
 2016 – Victorian Institute of Sport  Elite Athlete with a Disability Award
2018 – International Tennis Federation Quad Wheelchair World Champion
 2019 – Logie Awards – Graham Kennedy Award for Most Popular New Talent
2019 – Victorian Institute of Sport Elite Athlete with a Disability Award 
2019 – Tennis Australia Most Outstanding Athlete with a Disability
2022 – Victorian State Representative Australian of the Year
2021 - Governor’s Award Victorian Male Athlete of the Year – Frank Wilkes Award 
2022 – Australian of the Year
 2022 – Officer of the Order of Australia for "distinguished service to paralympic sport, particularly to tennis, and as a role model for people with disability, and to the community through a range of organisations."

References

External links

 
 
 
 
 
 Dylan Alcott Full Biography at ICMI.com.au

1990 births
Living people
People educated at Brighton Grammar School
Australian men's wheelchair basketball players
Australian male tennis players
Australian wheelchair tennis players
Australian of the Year Award winners
Paralympic wheelchair basketball players of Australia
Paralympic wheelchair tennis players of Australia
Paralympic gold medalists for Australia
Paralympic silver medalists for Australia
Paralympic medalists in wheelchair basketball
Paralympic medalists in wheelchair tennis
Medalists at the 2008 Summer Paralympics
Medalists at the 2012 Summer Paralympics
Medalists at the 2016 Summer Paralympics
Wheelchair basketball players at the 2008 Summer Paralympics
Wheelchair basketball players at the 2012 Summer Paralympics
Wheelchair tennis players at the 2016 Summer Paralympics
Wheelchair tennis players at the 2020 Summer Paralympics
Officers of the Order of Australia
Television presenters with disabilities
People with paraplegia
Australian disability rights activists
Illinois Fighting Illini Paralympic athletes
Tennis people from Victoria (Australia)
Guards (basketball)
Australian republicans
ITF number 1 ranked wheelchair tennis players
ITF World Champions
People from Hampton, Victoria
Sportspeople from Melbourne